The Shorncliffe railway line is an  suburban railway line situated north of Brisbane, the state capital of Queensland, Australia. It is part of the Queensland Rail City network.

History

The Sandgate Railway, opened in 1882, was the first truly suburban railway in Brisbane, built to provide convenient access to the seaside for the city's residents. The terminus was originally named Sandgate and was renamed Shorncliffe in 1938. The current Sandgate station was originally named Sandgate Central. The line allowed Brisbane residents to travel to Moreton Bay's shoreline at Shorncliffe.

Duplication was completed by December 1901.

Trains to Sandgate originally travelled via what is now the Exhibition line prior to the opening of the tunnel between Central and Brunswick Street in 1890.
The Shorncliffe line is going to be used as a pilot test for the implementation of ETCS, (European Train Control System), prior to its introduction with Cross River Rail.

Line guide and services
Most services to and/from Shorncliffe continue onto the Cleveland line.  The typical travel time between Shorncliffe and Brisbane City is approximately 33 minutes (to Central).

Passengers for/from the Caboolture and Nambour and Gympie North lines change at Northgate, Airport and Doomben lines at Eagle Junction, Ferny Grove line at Bowen Hills, and all other lines at Central.

References

External links
Queensland Rail

Brisbane railway lines
Public transport in Brisbane
Railway lines opened in 1882
3 ft 6 in gauge railways in Australia